David Floyd Weaver (May 12, 1941 – November 17, 2008) was a Major League Baseball pitcher who was born in Ben Franklin, Texas. He attended Pecan Gap High School in Pecan Gap, TX then Paris Junior College in Paris, Texas, where he excelled in baseball and basketball. On May 10, 1961, Weaver struck out 21 batters in a nine-inning game at Grand Junction, Colorado, still a collegiate record. Signing with the Cleveland Indians in 1961, he debuted with them on September 30, . Weaver had a 4–5 career record in 85 games. In 155.1 career innings, he allowed 149 hits with an ERA 5.21. Floyd's final game was on September 26, 1971. He batted and threw right-handed and was 6 foot 4.

Weaver died in Paris on November 17, 2008, at age 67.

External links

1941 births
2008 deaths
Baseball players from Texas
Major League Baseball pitchers
Milwaukee Brewers players
Chicago White Sox players
Cleveland Indians players
Portland Beavers players
Salt Lake City Bees players
Wichita Aeros players
Paris Dragons baseball players
Tucson Toros players
Columbus White Sox players
Phoenix Giants players
Toledo Mud Hens players
Jacksonville Suns players
Charleston Indians players
Burlington Indians players (1958–1964)
Selma Cloverleafs players